Sabine is a feminine given name of ancient Roman origin that is popular in continental Europe. 

Notable people with the name include:

 Sabine Appelmans (born 1972), Belgian former tennis player
 Sabine Auken (born 1965), German bridge player
 Sabine Azéma (born 1949), French actress and director
 Sabine Baeß (born 1961), German pair skater
 Sabine Baring-Gould (1834–1924), English Victorian hagiographer, antiquarian, novelist and eclectic scholar
 Sabine Bätzing-Lichtenthäler (born 1975), German politician
 Sabine Becker (born 1959), German speed skater
 Sabine Bergmann-Pohl (born 1946), East German head of state
 Sabine Bethmann (born 1931), German movie actress
 Sabine Bohlmann (born 1969), German actress
 Sabine Bothe (born 1960), German handball goalkeeper
 Sabine Bramhoff (born 1964), German high jumper
 Sabine Braun (born 1965), German track and field athlete
 Sabine Busch (born 1962),  German athlete
 Sabine Christiansen (born 1957), German journalist and television presenter
 Sabine Dardenne (born 1983), Belgian kidnap victim
 Sabine de Bethune (born 1958), Belgian politician
 Sabine Devieilhe (born 1985), French opera singer
 Sabine Egger (born 1977), Austrian alpine skier
 Sabine Eichenberger (born 1968), Swiss sprint canoeist
 Sabine Engel (born 1954), German discus thrower
 Sabine Everts (born 1961), German heptathlete
 Sabine Getty, English jewelry designer
 Sabine Ginther (born 1970), Austrian alpine skier
 Sabine Günther (born 1963), German sprinter
 Sabine Hack (born 1969), German tennis player
 Sabine Hark (born 1962), German feminist and sociologist
 Sabine Haudepin (born 1955), French actress
 Sabine Hazboun (born 1994), Palestinian swimmer
 Sabine Heinrich (born 1976), German radio and television presenter
 Sabine Heitling (born 1987), Brazilian athlete
 Sabine Herbst (born 1974), German swimmer
 Sabine Herold (born 1981), French political activist
 Sabine Holtz (born 1959), German historian
 Sabine Hossenfelder, German Theoretical Physicist
 Sabine John (born 1957), German heptathlete
 Sabine Jünger (born 1973), German politician
 Sabine Kalter (1890–1957), Polish opera singer
 Sabine Karsenti, French-Canadian actress
 Sabine Klaschka (born 1980), German tennis player
 Sabine Krantz (born 1981), German race walker
 Sabine Kratze (c. 1970–1995), German protester by self-immolation
 Sabine Kuegler (born 1972), German author
 Sabine Laruelle (born 1965), Belgian politician
 Sabine Lepsius (1864–1942), German painter
 Sabine Leutheusser-Schnarrenberger (born 1951), German politician
 Sabine Lisicki (born 1989), German tennis player
 Sabine Meyer (born 1959), German classical clarinetist
 Sabine Moritz (born 1969), German painter and graphic designer
 Sabine Moussier (born 1966), German-Mexican actress.
 Sabine Paturel (born 1965), French singer and actress
 Sabine Pigalle (born 1963), French photographer and artist
 Sabine Pochert, German canoeist
 Sabine Poleyn (born 1973), Flemish politician
 Sabine Quindou, French television journalist
 Sabine Rantzsch (born 1953), German Olympic swimmer
 Sabine Röther (born 1957), German handball player
 Sabine Schmitz (1969–2021), German race car driver
 Sabine Singh (born 1974), American actress
 Sabine Sinjen (1942–1995), German film actress
 Sabine Skvara (born 1966), Austrian high jumper
 Sabine Spitz (born 1971), German cross country cyclist
 Sabine Tröger (born 1967),  Austrian former sprinter
 Sabine Uitslag (born 1973), Dutch politician
 Sabine Ulibarrí (1919–2003), (male) American poet
 Sabine Verheyen (born 1964), German politician
 Sabine Völker (born 1973), German speed skater
 Sabine von Maydell (born 1955), German television actress
 Sabine Wagner, German Paralympian
 Sabine Werner (born 1960), German biochemist
 Sabine Winn (1734–1798), Swiss textile artist
 Sabine Zlatin (1907–1996), French resistance member

See also 
 Sabine (surname)

Feminine given names
German feminine given names
French feminine given names